The St. Louis PT-LM-4 was a primary trainer design for use in the Civilian Pilot Training Program of World War II.

Design
The PT-LM-4 was a low-wing, open cockpit, tandem seat, trainer with conventional landing gear, powered by a  Ranger 6-440C-3 engine. The fuselage was constructed of welded steel tubing with aluminum skins. The wings used aluminum construction with aircraft fabric covering. Fairchild won the training contract, with St. Louis Aircraft Company building licensed versions of the PT-19 instead.

Specifications (PT-LM-4)

See also

References

1940s United States military trainer aircraft